Rudak (also Romanized as Rūdak; also known as Roudbarak) is a village in Rudbar-e Qasran Rural District, Rudbar-e Qasran District, Shemiranat County, Tehran Province, Iran. At the 2006 census, its population was 767, in 214 families.

The Imamzadeh of Mohammad-Baqer, built during the reign of Fath-Ali Shah Qajar (1797-1834), is located in Rudak.

References

Sources  
 

Populated places in Shemiranat County